José Luis García Pérez (born 1972 in Sevilla, Spain) is an Andalusian actor in film, theatre, and television. He studied at the  Centro Andaluz de Teatro (CAT). Perez portrayed the role of Pedro in the 2005 film Cachorro, where he was nominated for a Goya Award for Best Newcomer. He has worked with Gerardo Herrero, Benito Zambrano, and José Luis Garci in film; and Blanca Portillo and Carlos Saura in theater. Perez was the founder and director of Quijotada, a show that has toured Spain and other countries. He runs his own company, "Digo Digo Teatro". Perez hosted the 39th Latin American Film Festival of Huelva. Pérez directed Vampiros, which revolves around the story of Dracula.

Filmography

Actor

Director

Theatre

Actor

Director 
Celosías (2012) (Microteatro)
Vampiros, la belleza siniestra (2006)
Quijotadas (2005)
Nombre de mujer (1996-1997)
Vayas donde vayas (1996)

References

External links

José Luis García Pérez: "Quiero que la gente vea a Juanjo como un canalla encantador" - interview by Antena 3 Televisión 

1972 births
Living people
People from Seville
Spanish male film actors
Spanish male stage actors
Spanish male television actors
Male actors from Andalusia